Polyxenus is a genus of millipede in the order Polyxenida, containing at least 30 valid species as of 2012.

Species

Polyxenus albus Pocock, 1894
Polyxenus anacapensis Pierce, 1940
Polyxenus anophthalius Ishii & Yin, 2000
Polyxenus buxtoni Brollemann, 1921
Polyxenus caudatus Menge, 1854
Polyxenus chalcidicus Conde & Nguyen Duy-Jacquemin, 1971
Polyxenus chilensis Silvestri, 1903
Polyxenus colurus Menge, 1854
Polyxenus conformis Koch & Berendt, 1854
Polyxenus fasciculatus Say, 1821
Polyxenus germanicus Verhoeff, 1941
Polyxenus hangzhoensis Ishii & Liang, 1990
Polyxenus hawaiiensis Silvestri, 1904
Polyxenus koreanus Ishii & Choi, 1988
Polyxenus lagurus (Linnaeus, 1758)
Polyxenus lapidicola Silvestri, 1903
Polyxenus lepagei Mello-Leitao, 1925
Polyxenus lophurus Menge, 1854
Polyxenus lucidus Chalande, 1888
Polyxenus macedonicus Verhoeff, 1952
Polyxenus oromii Nguyen Duy-Jacquemin, 1996
Polyxenus ovalis Koch & Berendt, 1854
Polyxenus paraguayensis Silvestri, 1903
Polyxenus platensis Silvestri, 1903
Polyxenus ponticus Lignau, 1903
Polyxenus pugetensis Kincaid, 1898
Polyxenus rossi Chamberlin, 1957
Polyxenus senex Mello-Leitao, 1925
Polyxenus shinoharai Ishii, 1983
Polyxenus sokolowi Lignau, 1924
Polyxenus superbus Silvestri, 1903
Polyxenus triocellatus Ishii & Yin, 2000
Polyxenus tuberculatus Pierce, 1940

Fossil species
 †Polyxenus miocenica Srivastava et al. 2006 Kerala amber, India, Miocene
 †Polyxenus ovalis Koch and Berendt 1854 Baltic amber, Eocene
 †Polyxenus coniformis Koch and Berendt 1854 Baltic amber, Eocene
 †Polyxenus colurus Menge 1854 Baltic amber, Eocene
 †Polyxenus caudatus Menge 1854 Baltic amber, Eocene
 †Polyxenus lophurus Menge 1854 Baltic amber, Eocene

References

Polyxenida
Millipede genera